1968–69 was the 22nd season of the Western International Hockey League. 
The WIHL played an interleague schedule with the Alberta Senior Hockey League.

Standings
 Spokane Jets			48		31	14	 3	 			195	161		 65
 Kimberley Dynamiters		48		27	18	 3				191	167		 57
 Nelson Maple Leafs 	        48		28	20	 0				215	161		 56
 Trail Smoke Eaters		48		22	26	 0				185	196		 44
 Cranbrook Royals		48		13	34	 1				157	230		 27

Playoffs

Semi finals (best of 7)
 Kimberley defeated Nelson 4 games to 1 (6-2, 1-4, 5-1, 6-3, 6-4)
 Spokane defeated Trail 4 games to 0 (8-2, 5-1, 3-1, 4-3)

Final (best of 7)
 Spokane defeated Kimberley 4 games to 1 (4-2, 5-3, 1-2, 3-2 OT, 4-3)

The Spokane Jets advanced to the 1969 Western Canada Allan Cup Playoffs.

References 

Western International Hockey League seasons
Wihl
Wihl